The 37th Golden Horse Awards (Mandarin:第37屆金馬獎) took place on December 2, 2000 at Sun Yat-sen Memorial Hall in Taipei, Taiwan.

References

37th
2000 film awards
2000 in Taiwan